Kayaamat - Jabb Bhi Waqt Aata Hai is a Hindi-language thriller television series that aired on DD National. It used to run on Fridays and Saturdays at 9 P.M. from 26 September 2003 to 19 March 2005.

Plot
Kayaamat revolves around the love and revenge of the Ahuja family. The story takes off when the celebrations in the Ahuja family are in full swing, with the engagement of Naren and Naina’s son Uday (Ali Hassan) with Pooja (Kishwer Merchant). Pooja loves Uday to the point of obsession; she wants to own and possess him completely. Her insecurities about Uday get aggravated and go completely out of control with the presence of Anamika (Amita Chandekar), the CEO of a company that does huge business with the Ahuja's. Pooja, at her engagement, sees subtle chemistry developing between Uday and Anamika. Pooja now goes on a rampage as she wants to wreck Anamika. Her love life with Uday can meet its happy end; however, Pooja realizes that Anamika is not easy to defeat. In due course of time, Anamika becomes a favourite of Pooja's family and the Ahuja's. At this point, Pooja decides to go for the final kill. But the question remains that who is Anamika? Is she what she portrays to be, or does she have her own story and reasons for coming to the Ahuja family? Is she as innocent as she portrays, or is this all a plan to achieve her goal and objective? What follows is an ensuing battle to safeguard the honour and prestige of the Ahuja family.

Cast
 Amita Chandekar as Anamika Uday Ahuja
 Ali Hassan as Uday Ahuja
 Kishwer Merchant as Pooja Devan Ahuja
 Aashish Kaul as Devan Ahuja
 Anand Suryavanshi as Rohan
 Anand Goradia as Yashwant (Babu)
 Dimple Hirji as Diya Devan Ahuja
 Faizan Kidwai as Sanju Ahuja
 Neelam Mehra as Naina Naren Ahuja
 Tushar Joshi as Naren Ahuja 
 Shilpa Mehta as Himani Ahuja
 Mithilesh Chaturvedi as Preet
 Chandni Bhagwanani as Child Anisha Ahuja
 Ishaan Bhatia as Child Anish Ahuja
 Sanjay Gandhi as Advocate Prashant
 Shravani Goswami as Ranjana
 Balwant Bansal as Mr. Ahuja
 Lily Patel as Gayatri Ahuja
 Varun Khandelwal as Samar
 Keerti Gaekwad Kelkar as Kajal Ahuja
 Malavika Shivpuri as Ananya Uday Ahuja
 Aashka Goradia as Vishaka
 Tiya Gandwani as Maa Anandsheela
 Vishal Saini as Raja
 Jarnail Singh as Balbir
 Gaurav Khanna as Rajesh
 Anil Nagrath as Anamika and Ananya's father
 Surekha Sikri as Maa Ji
 Nikhhil R Khera as Dev (son in law of Ahuja family)
 Geetanjali Roy as Netra
 Firoz Ali as Samrat

References

External links
Watch Title Track
Balaji Telefilms

Balaji Telefilms television series
2003 Indian television series debuts
2005 Indian television series endings
DD National original programming
Indian television soap operas